The 2012–13 Turkish Basketball League, which is called Beko Basketball League due to sponsorship reasons, was the 47th season of the top professional basketball league in Turkey.

The regular season started on October 13, 2012, and ended on May 15, 2013. Playoffs started on May 17, 2013, and ended on June 15, 2013. Beşiktaş were the defending champions. Galatasaray Medical Park won their 5th title, after not winning one for twenty three years.

Clubs and arenas

The league consists of the following member clubs:

Regular season

League table

Results
{| style="font-size: 85%; text-align: center" class="wikitable"
|-
|
| align="center" width=50|APE
| width=50|AEF
| width=50|ABB
| width=50|BAN
| width=50|BJK
| width=50|ERD
| width=50|FBÜ
| width=50|GSM
| width=50|HAC
| width=50|MBB
| width=50|OLE
| width=50|KSK
| width=50|RHG
| width=50|TED
| width=50|TOF
| width=50|TTS
|-
|align=left|Aliağa Petkim
| style="background:#ccc;"|
| style="background:#fdd;"| 57–59
| style="background:#fdd;"| 74–92
| style="background:#fdd;"| 70–87
| style="background:#fdd;"| 72–76
| style="background:#fdd;"| 66–72
| style="background:#fdd;"| 71–79
| style="background:#fdd;"| 77–78
| style="background:#dfd;"| 73–70
| style="background:#fdd;"| 73–82
| style="background:#dfd;"| 85–80
| style="background:#fdd;"| 75–80
| style="background:#dfd;"| 104–86
| style="background:#dfd;"| 70–68
| style="background:#dfd;"| 81–67
| style="background:#dfd;"| 81–79
|-
|align=left|Anadolu Efes
| style="background:#dfd;"| 83–67
| style="background:#ccc;"| 
| style="background:#dfd;"| 96–72
| style="background:#dfd;"| 79–69
| style="background:#dfd;"| 90–74
| style="background:#dfd;"| 76–72
| style="background:#dfd;"| 94–76
| style="background:#fdd;"| 73–83
| style="background:#dfd;"| 91–61
| style="background:#dfd;"| 104–71
| style="background:#dfd;"| 83–82
| style="background:#dfd;"| 71–65
| style="background:#dfd;"| 95–57
| style="background:#dfd;"| 85–67
| style="background:#dfd;"|86–72
| style="background:#dfd;"| 74–69
|-
|align=left|Antalya BB
| style="background:#dfd;"| 83–78
| style="background:#fdd;"| 65–74
| style="background:#ccc;"|
| style="background:#fdd;"| 95–100
| style="background:#fdd;"| 83–90
| style="background:#fdd;"| 74–75
| style="background:#fdd;"| 83–86
| style="background:#fdd;"| 57–93
| style="background:#fdd;"| 70–88
| style="background:#fdd;"| 86–96
| style="background:#fdd;"| 59–71
| style="background:#fdd;"| 74–88
| style="background:#fdd;"| 68–87
| style="background:#fdd;"| 73–103
| style="background:#dfd;"| 73–68
| style="background:#fdd;"| 77–88
|-
|align=left|Banvit
| style="background:#dfd;"| 94–79
| style="background:#dfd;"| 82–76
| style="background:#dfd;"| 96–67
| style="background:#ccc;"|
| style="background:#dfd;"| 79–69
| style="background:#dfd;"| 92–68
| style="background:#dfd;"| 91–88
| style="background:#dfd;"| 74–67
| style="background:#dfd;"| 85–78
| style="background:#dfd;"| 71–60
| style="background:#dfd;"| 62–51
| style="background:#fdd;"| 65–73
| style="background:#dfd;"| 95–81
| style="background:#dfd;"|112–76
| style="background:#dfd;"| 85–77
| style="background:#dfd;"| 80–72
|-
|align=left|Beşiktaş Milangaz
| style="background:#dfd;"| 79–66
| style="background:#fdd;"| 67–74
| style="background:#dfd;"| 86–69
| style="background:#fdd;"| 56–67
| style="background:#ccc;"|
| style="background:#dfd;"| 73–62
| style="background:#fdd;"| 70–78
| style="background:#fdd;"| 72–76
| style="background:#dfd;"| 69–63
| style="background:#dfd;"| 83–75
| style="background:#dfd;"| 87–58
| style="background:#fdd;"| 59–70
| style="background:#dfd;"| 83–69
| style="background:#dfd;"| 110–105
| style="background:#dfd;"| 72–55
| style="background:#dfd;"| 61–60
|-
|align=left|Erdemir
| style="background:#dfd;"| 71–61
| style="background:#fdd;"| 46–78
| style="background:#dfd;"| 77–50
| style="background:#fdd;"| 75–82
| style="background:#fdd;"| 77–92
| style="background:#ccc;"|
| style="background:#fdd;"| 78–83
| style="background:#fdd;"| 62–85
| style="background:#fdd;"| 69–71
| style="background:#dfd;"| 96–86
| style="background:#fdd;"| 82–91
| style="background:#fdd;"| 54–64
| style="background:#dfd;"| 91–89
| style="background:#fdd;"| 82–84
| style="background:#fdd;"| 70–79
| style="background:#dfd;"| 77–64
|-
|align=left|Fenerbahçe Ülker
| style="background:#dfd;"| 95–61
| style="background:#fdd;"| 86–90
| style="background:#dfd;"| 90–78
| style="background:#dfd;"| 89–69
| style="background:#dfd;"| 83–74
| style="background:#dfd;"| 82–77
| style="background:#ccc;"|
| style="background:#dfd;"| 74–67
| style="background:#dfd;"| 81–76
| style="background:#dfd;"| 74–50
| style="background:#dfd;"| 98–61
| style="background:#dfd;"| 78–76
| style="background:#dfd;"| 95–59
| style="background:#dfd;"| 79–77
| style="background:#dfd;"| 74–66
| style="background:#dfd;"| 103–81
|-
|align=left|Galatasaray Medical Park
| style="background:#dfd;"| 79–67
| style="background:#dfd;"| 77–70
| style="background:#dfd;"| 85–65
| style="background:#dfd;"| 83–75
| style="background:#dfd;"| 64–60
| style="background:#dfd;"| 84–61
| style="background:#dfd;"| 66–53
| style="background:#ccc;"|
| style="background:#dfd;"| 83–52
| style="background:#dfd;"| 68–95
| style="background:#dfd;"| 81–62
| style="background:#dfd;"| 94–73
| style="background:#dfd;"| 84–66
| style="background:#dfd;"| 90–66
| style="background:#dfd;"| 71–61
| style="background:#dfd;"| 89–73
|-
|align=left|Hacettepe Üniv.
| style="background:#fdd;"| 63–66
| style="background:#fdd;"| 54–87
| style="background:#fdd;"| 78–85
| style="background:#fdd;"| 70–91
| style="background:#fdd;"| 57–84
| style="background:#dfd;"| 75–70
| style="background:#fdd;"| 59–92
| style="background:#fdd;"| 69–104
| style="background:#ccc;"|
| style="background:#fdd;"| 72–76
| style="background:#dfd;"| 62–70
| style="background:#fdd;"| 52–79
| style="background:#fdd;"| 88–95
| style="background:#fdd;"| 85–92
| style="background:#fdd;"| 70–85
| style="background:#fdd;"| 75–80
|-
|align=left|Mersin BB
| style="background:#fdd;"| 81–91
| style="background:#fdd;"| 98–107
| style="background:#dfd;"| 87–86
| style="background:#fdd;"| 90–92
| style="background:#fdd;"| 84–102
| style="background:#fdd;"| 61–88
| style="background:#fdd;"| 77–81
| style="background:#fdd;"| 68–95
| style="background:#dfd;"| 89–69
| style="background:#ccc;"|
| style="background:#fdd;"| 83–87
| style="background:#fdd;"| 78–84
| style="background:#fdd;"| 86–98
| style="background:#fdd;"| 91–94
| style="background:#fdd;"| 85–88
| style="background:#dfd;"| 89–81
|-
|align=left|Olin Edirne
| style="background:#fdd;"| 67–72
| style="background:#fdd;"| 66–72
| style="background:#dfd;"| 83–65
| style="background:#fdd;"| 67–69
| style="background:#fdd;"| 67–83
| style="background:#dfd;"| 90–53
| style="background:#fdd;"| 67–83 
| style="background:#fdd;"| 59–69
| style="background:#fdd;"| 60–81
| style="background:#fdd;"| 62–74
| style="background:#ccc;"|
| style="background:#fdd;"| 60–81
| style="background:#dfd;"| 75–56
| style="background:#fdd;"| 70–76
| style="background:#fdd;"| 72–73
| style="background:#fdd;"| 63–67
|-
|align=left|Pınar Karşıyaka
| style="background:#dfd;"| 83–51
| style="background:#dfd;"| 62–57
| style="background:#dfd;"| 90–66
| style="background:#fdd;"| 66–68
| style="background:#dfd;"| 86–79
| style="background:#dfd;"| 92–65
| style="background:#dfd;"| 72–66
| style="background:#dfd;"| 72–69
| style="background:#dfd;"| 83–69
| style="background:#dfd;"| 85–73
| style="background:#dfd;"| 82–70
| style="background:#ccc;"|
| style="background:#fdd;"| 57–66
| style="background:#dfd;"| 87–66
| style="background:#dfd;"| 87–77
| style="background:#dfd;"| 79–66
|-
|align=left|Royal Halı Gaziantep
| style="background:#dfd;"| 84–70
| style="background:#fdd;"| 82–92
| style="background:#dfd;"| 79–72
| style="background:#fdd;"| 73–83
| style="background:#dfd;"| 76–66
| style="background:#fdd;"| 75–78
| style="background:#fdd;"| 69–86
| style="background:#fdd;"| 67–92
| style="background:#dfd;"| 78–61
| style="background:#dfd;"| 79–74
| style="background:#dfd;"| 85–82
| style="background:#fdd;"| 74–87
| style="background:#ccc;"|
| style="background:#fdd;"| 79–86
| style="background:#fdd;"| 69–78 
| style="background:#dfd;"| 81–69
|-
|align=left|TED Ankara Kolejliler
| style="background:#dfd;"| 80–76
| style="background:#dfd;"| 86–85
| style="background:#fdd;"| 89–93
| style="background:#fdd;"| 76–81
| style="background:#fdd;"| 64–69
| style="background:#dfd;"| 87–81
| style="background:#fdd;"| 74–92
| style="background:#fdd;"| 86–94
| style="background:#dfd;"| 84–60
| style="background:#dfd;"| 88–85
| style="background:#dfd;"| 89–85
| style="background:#dfd;"| 81–64
| style="background:#dfd;"| 91–73
| style="background:#ccc;"|
| style="background:#dfd;"| 81–72
| style="background:#dfd;"| 84–77
|-
|align=left|Tofaş
| style="background:#dfd;"| 76–66
| style="background:#fdd;"| 71–94
| style="background:#dfd;"| 91–80
| style="background:#fdd;"| 76–77
| style="background:#fdd;"| 62–74
| style="background:#fdd;"| 89–93
| style="background:#dfd;"| 81–73
| style="background:#fdd;"| 52–66
| style="background:#dfd;"| 87–79
| style="background:#dfd;"| 71–68
| style="background:#fdd;"| 73–75
| style="background:#dfd;"| 95–94
| style="background:#dfd;"| 77–76
| style="background:#fdd;"| 80–93
| style="background:#ccc;"|
| style="background:#fdd;"| 66–67
|-
|align=left|Türk Telekom
| style="background:#fdd;"| 66–77
| style="background:#fdd;"| 57–96
| style="background:#dfd;"| 76–75
| style="background:#dfd;"| 81–76
| style="background:#fdd;"| 59–85
| style="background:#fdd;"| 94–103
| style="background:#fdd;"| 80–90
| style="background:#fdd;"| 70–76
| style="background:#fdd;"| 70–77
| style="background:#fdd;"| 78–80
| style="background:#dfd;"| 81–78
| style="background:#fdd;"| 65–84
| style="background:#fdd;"| 67–90
| style="background:#fdd;"| 55–89
| style="background:#dfd;"| 76–70
| style="background:#ccc;"|
|-

Playoffs

Individual statistics

Points

Rebounds

Assists

Blocks

Steals
{| class="wikitable" style="text-align: center;"
|-
!Rank
!width=170|Name
!width=150|Team
!width=40|Stl
!width=40|G
!width=40|
|-
|1.||align="left"| J.P. Prince||Mersin BB||55||29||1.9
|-
|2.||align="left"| Jordan Theodore||Antalya BB||47||29||1.6
|-
|3.||align="left"| Sasha Vujačić||Anadolu Efes||28||18||1.6
|-
|4.||align="left"| Jamon Gordon||Anadolu Efes||44||29||1.5
|-
|5.||align="left"| Bo McCalebb||Fenerbahçe Ülker||36||24||1.5
|-

External links
Official Site
TBLStat.net History Page

References

Turkish Basketball Super League seasons
Turkish
1